DJD or djd may refer to:

 Discoveries in the Judaean Desert, a collection of ancient texts
 Degenerative Joint Disease, an alternative term for osteoarthritis
 djd, the ISO-639 code for the Jaminjung language of Australia
 The Decepticon Justice Division, a fictional group from the comic series Transformers: More Than Meets the Eye.